Slattery Peak is a somewhat isolated rock peak (about 600 m) that rises above the ice mantle southeast of Mount Terror on Ross Island. The peak position is additionally defined as 5.5 nautical miles (10 km) southwest of The Knoll and 3.8 nautical miles (7 km) east-northeast of Rohnke Crests. Named after Leo Slattery, who wintered at Scott Base three times, twice as Officer in Charge; Post Clerk on Ross Island, summer 1973–74; Postmaster on Ross Island, summers 1979–80, 1981–82, and 1983–84.

Mountains of Ross Island